Bambai Raat Ki Bahon Mein is a 1967 suspense crime-thriller Hindi film written, produced and directed by Khwaja Ahmad Abbas. The film starred Vimal Ahuja, Surekha, David, Irshad Panjatan, A. K. Hangal, Madhukar, Kuljit Pal and debutantes Jalal Agha and Persis Khambatta in major roles.

At the 1967 National Film Awards it won the National Film Award for Best Cinematography for Ramachandra.

Cast
 Vimal Ahuja as Amar Kumar
 Surekha as Asha
 Madhavi as Rosy
 David Abraham as Barrister Rameshchand
 Persis Khambatta as Lily / Leela 
 Prakash as Tikam / Toto
 Yunus Parvez as Chaiwala
 Akhtar Siraj 
 Jalal Agha as Johnny / Joseph
 A.K. Hangal as Sonadas Doleria
 Prithviraj Kapoor as himself
 Irshad Panjatan as Sevakram

Soundtrack
The film has music by J.P. Kaushik and lyrics by Hasan Kamal.

 "Bambai Raat Ki Bahon Mein" - Asha Bhosle
 "Jalti Hui Jawanian Yeh Unkahi Kahaniyan" - Mahendra Kapoor
 "Usne Jo Kaha Mujse Ek Geet Suna Do Na" - Sulakshana Pandit

References

External links
 
 

1967 films
1960s crime thriller films
1960s Hindi-language films
Films set in Mumbai
Films directed by K. A. Abbas
Films whose cinematographer won the Best Cinematography National Film Award
Indian crime thriller films